Stanley "Pops" Heal (30 July 1920 – 15 December 2010) was an Australian rules footballer who played for Melbourne in the Victorian Football League (VFL) as well as West Perth in the West Australian National Football League (WANFL) during the 1940s and early 1950s.

Heal played his best football as a wingman but was also used on occasions as a rover. The Western Australian spent just one season at Melbourne, who had acquired his services while he was temporarily stationed in Victoria. Despite playing just eight games he was a member of Melbourne's 1941 premiership team. The following week he played in another premiership, back home in Western Australia with West Perth.

He was also regular interstate representative for Western Australia, winning a Simpson Medal for his performance in a game against South Australia in 1949 and captaining his state at the 1950 Brisbane Carnival.

As coach of West Perth from 1947 to 1952 he steered his club to two premierships, in 1949 and 1951.

From 1953 to 1965 he was a Labor member of the Western Australian Legislative Assembly, representing the seat of West Perth until 1962 and Perth thereafter.

Heal was inducted into the Australian Football Hall of Fame in 2010. He died on 15 December 2010.

References

External links

Hall of Fame profile

1920 births
2010 deaths
Australian rules footballers from Western Australia
Melbourne Football Club players
West Perth Football Club players
West Perth Football Club coaches
Australian Football Hall of Fame inductees
West Australian Football Hall of Fame inductees
Australian Labor Party members of the Parliament of Western Australia
Members of the Western Australian Legislative Assembly
Melbourne Football Club Premiership players
One-time VFL/AFL Premiership players
Australian military personnel of World War II
Military personnel from Western Australia
20th-century Australian politicians
Australian sportsperson-politicians